Xevioso is a genus of African araneomorph spiders in the family Phyxelididae, and was first described by Pekka T. Lehtinen in 1967.

Species
 it contains eleven species, found only in Africa:
Xevioso amica Griswold, 1990 – South Africa
Xevioso aululata Griswold, 1990 – South Africa
Xevioso cepfi Pett & Jocqué, 2020 – Mozambique
Xevioso colobata Griswold, 1990 – South Africa
Xevioso jocquei Griswold, 1990 – Malawi
Xevioso kulufa Griswold, 1990 – South Africa
Xevioso lichmadina Griswold, 1990 – South Africa
Xevioso megcummingae Pett & Jocqué, 2020 – Malawi, Zimbabwe
Xevioso orthomeles Griswold, 1990 – Zimbabwe, Eswatini, South Africa
Xevioso tuberculata (Lawrence, 1939) (type) – South Africa
Xevioso zuluana (Lawrence, 1939) – South Africa

See also
 List of Phyxelididae species

References

Araneomorphae genera
Phyxelididae
Taxa named by Pekka T. Lehtinen